The 1991–92 Full Members' Cup, known as the Zenith Data Systems Cup for sponsorship reasons, was the 7th and final staging of a knock-out competition for English football clubs in the First and Second Division. The winners were Nottingham Forest and the runners-up were Southampton.

The competition began on 1 October 1991 and ended with the final on 29 March 1992 at the Wembley Stadium. The competition was then cancelled after seven seasons, when the Premier League arose from the old Football League First Division and reduced the Football League to three divisions.

In the first round, there were two sections: North and South. In the following rounds each section gradually eliminates teams in knock-out fashion until each has a winning finalist. At this point, the two winning finalists face each other in the combined final for the honour of the trophy.

Liverpool, Arsenal, Manchester United, Tottenham and Sunderland opted out of this competition.

First round

Northern Section

Southern Section

Second round

Northern Section

Southern Section

Third round

Northern Section

Southern Section

Area semi-finals

Northern Section

Southern Section

Area finals

Northern Area final

Nottingham Forest beat Leicester City 3–1 on aggregate.

Southern Area final

Southampton beat Chelsea 5–1 on aggregate.

Final

External links
When Saturday Comes - Article on the Full Members' Cup

Full Members' Cup
Full